This article lists the combat camera squadrons of the United States Air Force. Combat Camera (COMCAM) units are tasked with the acquisition of still and motion imagery of military operations.

Combat camera squadrons

See also
List of United States Air Force squadrons
First Motion Picture Unit

References

Combat Camera